Nelton Ndebele (born 6 June 1985) is a retired Zimbabwean sprinter who specialized in the 400 metres.

Individually he competed at the 2007 All-Africa Games (semi-final) and the 2011 All-Africa Games (semi-final).

In the 4 × 400 metres relay he won a bronze medal at the 2007 All-Africa Games and competed at the 2005 World Championships without reaching the final.

His personal best time was 46.23 seconds, achieved in May 2007 in Windhoek.

References

1985 births
Living people
Zimbabwean male sprinters
World Athletics Championships athletes for Zimbabwe
African Games medalists in athletics (track and field)
African Games bronze medalists for Zimbabwe
Athletes (track and field) at the 2007 All-Africa Games
Athletes (track and field) at the 2011 All-Africa Games